The 1999 Brisbane Broncos season was the twelfth in the club's history. Coached by Wayne Bennett and captained by Allan Langer then Kevin Walters, they competed in the NRL's 1999 premiership, finishing the regular season 8th (out of 17) and reaching the finals but losing their first play-off match.

Season summary 
1999 saw the departure of one of Brisbane's favourite sons, Allan "Alfie" Langer, after the Broncos had a shocking start to the season, losing 8 of the first 10 matches. The captaincy was passed onto Langer's partner in the halves, Kevin Walters part way through the season.

Under Walters' captaincy the club made a remarkable turnaround mid-season, winning 11 consecutive games to qualify for the finals in eighth position. However they were then easily disposed of 42-20 by the Cronulla-Sutherland Sharks in week one of the finals series at Toyota Park.

Match results 

 Game following a State of Origin match

Ladder

Scorers

Honours

League 
 Nil

Club 
 Player of the year: Gorden Tallis
 Rookie of the year: Lote Tuqiri
 Back of the year: Wendell Sailor
 Forward of the year: Gorden Tallis
 Club man of the year: John Plath

References 

Brisbane Broncos seasons
Brisbane Broncos season